The World Allround Speed Skating Championships for Men took place on 8 and 9 February 1975 in Oslo at the Bislett Stadium ice rink.

Classification

  * = Fell

Source:

Attribution
In Dutch

References 

World Allround Speed Skating Championships, 1975
1975 World Allround